The  is a multi-purpose dam on the main stream Sagami River in Sagamihara, Kanagawa Prefecture on the island of Honshū, Japan.

History
The potential of the Sagami River valley for hydroelectric power development began to be developed in the 1930s, with the growth of industry and electrical consumption in the Yokohama-Kanagawa industrial belt. Work on the Sagami Dam, the first dam on the main stream of the Sagami River began in 1938; however, lack of funding and the advent of World War II delayed completion until after the end of the war. Work on the Shiroyama Dam, in the former town of Tsukui, Tsukui District commenced in 1960 and was completed in 1965 by the Kumagai Gumi construction company.

Design
The Shiroyama Dam is a hollow-core concrete gravity dam. It was designed to provide flood control, and industrial and drinking water to the cities of Yokohama, Kawasaki, Yokosuka and the Shōnan area. It also serves as a Pumped-storage hydroelectricity facility in conjunction with the Honzawa Dam further upstream. The associated Shiroyama Hydroelectric Power Plant has a rated capacity of 250,000 kW of power, and the Tsukui Hydroelectric Power Plant has an additional capacity of 25,000 kW. The reversible turbine generators at the Shiroyama Power Plant were designed to function as either electrical power generators, or as pumps, to reverse the flow of water back into the reservoir of the Honzawa Dam in times of low demand.

 created by the dam is a major leisure destination in Kanagawa Prefecture, popular with boaters, fishers and campers.

Surroundings
Public access to the Shiroyama Dam and to Lake Tsukui are by Japan National Route 413, which actually runs across the top of the dam itself. Tsukuiko Shiroyama park is located near the dam.

References
Japan Commission on Large Dams. Dams in Japan:Past, Present and Future. CRC Press (2009). 
Takeuchi, Kuniyoshi. Sustainable Reservoir Development and Management. IAHS Press (November 1998).

External links

photo page

Gravity dams
Dams in Kanagawa Prefecture
Hydroelectric power stations in Japan
Dams completed in 1965
1965 establishments in Japan